Țareuca is a commune in Rezina District, Moldova. It is composed of two villages, Țahnăuți and Țareuca.

Notable people
 Valeriu Streleț

References

Communes of Rezina District
1468 establishments in Europe